Eben Alexander may refer to: 

 Eben Alexander (educator) (1851–1910), American educator
 Eben Alexander (author) (born 1953), American author and neurosurgeon
 Eben Alexander Jr (1913–2004), American neurosurgeon